Daniel Martín García (born 19 February 1977) is a Spanish singer. He was the vocalist of the pop punk band El Canto del Loco (ECDL).

Biography 
He was born on 19 February 1977 in Alcobendas, a city in the province of Madrid.

When he was a child, he used to imitate his favorite artists in the living room and started to dream about creating his own band. As he was not a really good student, he started to work with his father and, at the same time, he began to study at the Drama School William Layton. Later, Dani decided to attend prestigious Drama School Cristina Rota, where he got his first jobs as a stage actor. 
The first time he appeared on television was with Martes y 13 in a show prepared for New Year’s Eve. Then, he presented a program called Ponte las Pilas.

He has acted in several films, such as Sirenas by Fernando Leon de Aranoa, Sin vergüenza by Joaquín Oristrell, Auger Carlos Villaverde, Manuel Sanabria, and Yo soy la Juani by Bigas Luna. He was also acted in TV series such as Al salir de clase, Policías, en el corazón de la calle, Raquel busca su sitio, Petra Delicado, 7 vidas, Hospital Central, Los hombres de Paco and a small role in the movie Broken Embraces, directed by Pedro Almodóvar.
In 2000, Dani Martin created the music band El Canto del Loco and he started to combine his job as an actor with his new job as a singer. Between 2007-2008 he starred in a series called Cuenta Atrás, in which he played the role of an impulsive police chief inspector called Paul Corso. Dani Martin decided to leave the series in order to devote himself completely to the group El Canto del Loco.

Discography

Albums
with El Canto del Loco
2000: El Canto del Loco 
2002: A contracorriente
2003: Estados de ánimo
2005: Zapatillas
2008: Personas
2009: Radio la colifata presenta: El Canto del Loco

Solo
2010: Pequeño
2011: Pequeño... (Tesoro), Las Maquetas de Pequeño
2013: Dani Martín
2016: La Montaña Rusa
2017: Grandes Éxitos y Pequeños Desastres
2020: Lo Que Me Dé La Gana
2021: No, no Vuelve

Singles
2010: "16 añitos"
2010: "Mira la vida"
2011: "Mi lamento" (a tribute to his sister, who died on 2009 at the age of 34)
2011: "Cero"
2013: "Caminar"
2013: "Qué bonita la vida"
2014: "Emocional"
2014: "Mi Teatro"
2016: "Las ganas"
2016: "Los charcos"
2018: "Dieciocho"
2019: "La mentira"
2020: "Los huesos" (ft. Juanes)
2021: "Portales"
2021: "No, no vuelve"

Filmography

Films 
 El 92 cava con todo (1991)
 Sirenas (1994)
 Perdón, perdón (1998)
 Sobreviviré (1999)
 Sin vergüenza (2001)
 After (2001)
 I Love You Baby (2001)
 School of Rock (2003, European Spanish dub)
 Sinfín (2005)
 Torrente 3: El protector (2005)
 Yo soy la Juani (2006)
 El Canto del Loco: la película (2009)
 Los Abrazos Rotos (2009)

Television 
 Ponte las pilas (1991–1992)
 ¡Ay, Señor, Señor! (1 episode, 1995)
 Al salir de clase (2 episodes, 1998)
 El comisario (1 episodio, 1999)
 Policías, en el corazón de la calle (1 episode, 2000)
 Hospital Central (1 episode, 2000)
 Raquel busca su sitio (15 episodes, 2000)
 7 vidas (1 episodio, 2004)
 Latrelevisión (1 episodio, 2005)
 Cuenta atrás (2007–2008)
 Los hombres de Paco (2009)

References

External links 
 Official page of Dani Martin
 Official page of El Canto del Loco
 The internet movie database - Martín's filmography.
 VOY Plaza - 2006 news article about the band.
 English Language El Canto Del Loco Fan Site

1977 births
Living people
Male actors from Madrid
Singers from Madrid
Spanish rock singers
Spanish singer-songwriters
Rock en Español musicians
Spanish male film actors
Spanish male television actors
Spanish composers
Spanish male composers
20th-century Spanish male actors
21st-century Spanish male actors
21st-century Spanish singers
21st-century Spanish male singers
Sony Music Spain artists